This is a list of municipalities in Latvia which have standing links to local communities in other countries known as "town twinning" (usually in Europe) or "sister cities" (usually in the rest of the world).

A
Aizkraukle

 Biržai, Lithuania
 Eppstein, Germany
 Kiskunhalas, Hungary
 Slavutych, Ukraine
 Tczew, Poland
 Thale, Germany

Aizpute

 Karlskrona, Sweden
 Schwerzenbach, Switzerland

Alūksne

 Haanja (Võru Parish), Estonia
 Joniškis, Lithuania
 Misso (Võru Parish), Estonia
 Rõuge, Estonia
 Sundbyberg, Sweden
 Vastseliina (Võru Parish), Estonia
 Võru, Estonia
 Wettin-Löbejün, Germany

Amata

 Alytus, Lithuania
 Kinda, Sweden

Auce

 Akmenė, Lithuania
 Joniškis, Lithuania
 Józefów nad Wisłą, Poland
 Ölfus, Iceland
 Skhidnytsia, Ukraine
 Ungheni, Moldavia

B
Balvi

 Dokshytsy District, Belarus
 Kupiškis, Lithuania
 Põlva, Estonia
 Pytalovsky District, Russia
 Żukowo, Poland

Bauska

 Biržai, Lithuania
 Hedemora, Sweden
 Khashuri, Georgia
 Náchod, Czech Republic
 Pakruojis, Lithuania
 Pasvalys, Lithuania
 Radviliškis, Lithuania
 Rypin, Poland
 Soroca, Moldova

C
Cēsis

 Achim, Germany
 Gatchinsky District, Russia
 Konstancin-Jeziorna, Poland
 Rakvere, Estonia
 Rokiškis, Lithuania
 Tyresö, Sweden

Cesvaine

 Dnipropetrovsk Oblast, Ukraine
 Lagardelle-sur-Lèze, France
 Märjamaa, Estonia
 Volkhov, Russia
 Weyhe, Germany

D
Dagda

 Dubrowna, Belarus
 Narewka, Poland
 Smarhon’, Belarus
 Verkhnyadzvinsk, Belarus
 Visaginas, Lithuania

Daugavpils

 Alaverdi, Armenia
 Babruysk, Belarus
 Batumi, Georgia
 Central AO (Moscow), Russia

 Harbin, China
 Kharkiv, Ukraine
 Lida, Belarus

 Motala, Sweden
 Naro-Fominsk, Russia
 Panevėžys, Lithuania
 Pskov, Russia
 Radom, Poland
 Ramla, Israel
 Saint Petersburg, Russia
 Vagharshapat, Armenia
 Visaginas, Lithuania
 Vitebsk, Belarus

Daugavpils Municipality

 Bad Doberan (district), Germany
 Braslaw District, Belarus
 Edineț, Moldova
 Hlybokaye District, Belarus
 Ichnia Raion, Ukraine
 Łomża County, Poland
 Rokiškis, Lithuania
 Sharkawshchyna District, Belarus
 Vitebsk District, Belarus
 Zarasai, Lithuania
 Zaraysky District, Russia

Dobele

 Akmenė, Lithuania
 Ängelholm, Sweden
 Anykščiai, Lithuania
 Joniškis, Lithuania
 Konin, Poland
 Schmölln, Germany
 Viru-Nigula, Estonia

G
Gulbene

 Balmazújváros, Hungary
 Bolnisi, Georgia
 Florești, Moldova
 Kętrzyn (rural gmina), Poland
 Kętrzyn County, Poland
 Räpina, Estonia
 Rietavas, Lithuania
 Them (Silkeborg), Denmark
 Xızı, Azerbaijan

Gulbene – Lizums

 Iliny, Hungary
 Sečianky, Slovakia

I
Iecava

 Billerbeck, Germany
 Pasvalys, Lithuania
 Töreboda, Sweden

Ikšķile

 Haapsalu, Estonia
 Stolin, Belarus

J
Jēkabpils

 Averøy, Norway
 Białogard, Poland
 Czerwionka-Leszczyny, Poland
 Cumpăna, Romania
 Czeladź, Poland
 Kupiškis, Lithuania
 Maardu, Estonia
 Melle, Germany
 Myrhorod, Ukraine
 Qaraçuxur, Azerbaijan
 Parchim, Germany
 Rokiškis, Lithuania
 Sokołów Podlaski, Poland
 Vyzhnytsia, Ukraine
 Zarasai, Lithuania
 Zhydachiv, Ukraine

Jelgava

 Alcamo, Italy
 Białystok, Poland
 Como, Italy
 Hällefors, Sweden
 Ivano-Frankivsk, Ukraine
 Nova Odessa, Brazil
 Nacka, Sweden
 Pärnu, Estonia
 Rueil-Malmaison, France
 Šiauliai, Lithuania
 Vejle, Denmark
 Xinying (Tainan), Taiwan

Jelgava Municipality

 Alytus, Lithuania
 Argeș County, Romania
 Glodeni District, Moldova
 Joniškis, Lithuania
 Recklinghausen (district), Germany

 Trivero (Valdilana), Italy

Jūrmala

 Anadia, Portugal
 Anaklia (Zugdidi), Georgia
 Cabourg, France
 Eskilstuna, Sweden
 Gävle, Sweden
 Jakobstad, Finland
 Palanga, Lithuania
 Samarkand, Uzbekistan
 Terracina, Italy
 Türkmenbaşy, Turkmenistan

K
Ķekava

 Bordesholm, Germany
 Gostyń, Poland
 Lerum, Sweden
 Nilüfer, Turkey
 Nizami, Azerbaijan
 Raseiniai, Lithuania

Krāslava

 Aleksandrów Łódzki, Poland
 Hajnówka, Poland
 Volokolamsk, Russia

Kuldīga

 Frogn, Norway
 Geesthacht, Germany
 Mtskheta, Georgia

L
Liepāja

 Årstad (Bergen), Norway
 Bellevue, United States
 Darmstadt, Germany
 Elbląg, Poland
 Gdynia, Poland
 Guldborgsund, Denmark
 Helsingborg, Sweden
 Klaipėda, Lithuania
 Nynäshamn, Sweden
 Palanga, Lithuania

Limbaži

 Alver, Norway
 Anklam, Germany
 Klippan, Sweden
 Panevėžys District Municipality, Lithuania
 Sande, Norway

Limbaži – Aloja
 Corjeuți, Moldova

Limbaži – Salacgrīva

 Gori, Georgia
 Häädemeeste, Estonia
 Handewitt, Germany
 Nyköping, Sweden
 Qabala, Azerbaijan

Līvāni
 Ukmergė, Lithuania

Ludza

 Aue (Samtgemeinde), Germany

 Maków, Poland
 Molėtai, Lithuania
 Rokiškis, Lithuania
 Svishtov, Bulgaria

M
Madona

 Anykščiai, Lithuania
 Borjomi, Georgia
 Coulaines, France

 Tranås, Sweden
 Weyhe, Germany

O
Ogre

 Ånge, Sweden
 Bollnäs, Sweden
 Chernihiv, Ukraine
 Hengelo, Netherlands
 Jõhvi, Estonia
 Joué-lès-Tours, France
 Kelmė, Lithuania
 Kerava, Finland
 Maymana, Afghanistan
 Popasna, Ukraine
 Slonim, Belarus

Olaine

 Karlskoga, Sweden
 Nowa Sarzyna, Poland
 Ödeshög, Sweden
 Riihimäki, Finland

P
Pārgauja

 Motta Santa Lucia, Italy
 Oarja, Romania
 Rîșcani, Moldova
 Spydeberg, Norway

Preiļi

 Hlybokaye, Belarus
 Nizhyn, Ukraine
 Ocnița, Moldova
 Sahil, Azerbaijan
 Utena, Lithuania

R
Rēzekne

 Arendal, Norway
 Braslaw, Belarus
 Częstochowa, Poland
 Dmitrov, Russia
 Krychaw, Belarus
 Ostrov, Russia
 Pskov, Russia
 Sebezh, Russia
 Sianów, Poland
 Soroca, Moldova
 Utena, Lithuania
 Vitebsk, Belarus

Rēzekne Municipality

 Agder, Norway
 Edineț, Moldova
 Gölbaşı, Turkey
 Kupiškis, Lithuania
 Pastavy, Belarus
 Polotsk, Belarus

Riga

 Aalborg, Denmark
 Almaty, Kazakhstan
 Astana, Kazakhstan
 Beijing, China
 Bordeaux, France
 Bremen, Germany
 Cairns, Australia
 Dallas, United States
 Florence, Italy
 Kyiv, Ukraine
 Kobe, Japan
 Norrköping, Sweden
 Pori, Finland
 Rostock, Germany
 Santiago, Chile
 Suzhou, China
 Taipei, Taiwan
 Tallinn, Estonia
 Tartu, Estonia
 Tashkent, Uzbekistan
 Vilnius, Lithuania
 Warsaw, Poland
 Yerevan, Armenia

Rūjiena

 Higashikawa, Japan
 Karksi-Nuia (Mulgi), Estonia
 Mõisaküla (Mulgi), Estonia
 Montoro, Italy
 Norrtälje, Sweden

Rundāle

 Hajnówka County, Poland
 Põhja-Pärnumaa, Estonia
 Pakruojis, Lithuania
 Ropsha, Russia
 Svislach, Belarus
 Uggiate-Trevano, Italy
 Wiązowna, Poland

S
Salaspils

 Finspång, Sweden
 Finsterwalde, Germany
 Wieliszew, Poland

Saldus

 Florești, Moldova
 Lidingö, Sweden
 Liederbach am Taunus, Germany
 Mažeikiai, Lithuania
 Nevarėnai, Lithuania
 Paide, Estonia
 Sankt Andrä, Austria
 Sergiyev Posad, Russia
 Šilutė, Lithuania
 Stargard, Poland
 Tsqaltubo, Georgia
 Villebon-sur-Yvette, France
 Volda, Norway

Saulkrasti

 Gnesta, Sweden
 Neringa, Lithuania
 Odolanów, Poland
 Radashkovichy, Belarus

Sigulda is a member of the Douzelage, a town twinning association of towns across the European Union. Sigulda also has several other twin towns.

Douzelage
 Agros, Cyprus
 Altea, Spain
 Asikkala, Finland
 Bad Kötzting, Germany
 Bellagio, Italy
 Bundoran, Ireland
 Chojna, Poland
 Granville, France
 Holstebro, Denmark
 Houffalize, Belgium
 Judenburg, Austria
 Kőszeg, Hungary
 Marsaskala, Malta
 Meerssen, Netherlands
 Niederanven, Luxembourg
 Oxelösund, Sweden
 Preveza, Greece
 Rokiškis, Lithuania
 Rovinj, Croatia
 Sesimbra, Portugal
 Sherborne, England, United Kingdom
 Siret, Romania
 Škofja Loka, Slovenia
 Sušice, Czech Republic
 Tryavna, Bulgaria
 Türi, Estonia
 Zvolen, Slovakia
Other
 Angus, Scotland, United Kingdom
 Birštonas, Lithuania
 Chiatura, Georgia
 Chocz, Poland

 Keila, Estonia
 Stuhr, Germany
 Vesthimmerland, Denmark

Skrunda

 Kosiv, Ukraine
 Maen Roch, France

 Põltsamaa, Estonia

Smiltene

 Donnery, France
 Drohobych, Ukraine

 Novopolotsk, Belarus
 Pāvilosta, Latvia
 Pincara, Italy
 Písek, Czech Republic
 Porkhov, Russia
 Pustomyty, Ukraine
 Rovigo Province, Italy
 Steinkjer, Norway
 Wiesenbach, Germany
 Willich, Germany

Strenči

 Lainate, Italy
 Rimóc, Hungary
 Rosice, Czech Republic
 Sayda, Germany

T
Talsi

 Alanya, Turkey
 Lejre, Denmark
 Orhei, Moldova
 Prienai, Lithuania
 Saaremaa, Estonia
 Shchyolkovo, Russia
 Söderköping, Sweden
 Telavi, Georgia

Tukums

 Andrychów, Poland
 Chennevières-sur-Marne, France
 Ghelăuza, Moldova
 Izium, Ukraine
 Karelichy, Belarus
 Khoni, Georgia
 Krasnogorsk, Russia
 Lejre, Denmark
 Plungė, Lithuania
 Saku, Estonia
 Scheeßel, Germany
 Šilalė, Lithuania
 Strängnäs, Sweden
 Tidaholm, Sweden

Tukums – Kandava is a member of the Charter of European Rural Communities, a town twinning association across the European Union, along with:

 Bienvenida, Spain
 Bièvre, Belgium
 Bucine, Italy
 Cashel, Ireland
 Cissé, France
 Desborough, England, United Kingdom
 Esch (Haaren), Netherlands
 Hepstedt, Germany
 Ibănești, Romania
 Kannus, Finland
 Kolindros, Greece
 Lassee, Austria
 Medzev, Slovakia
 Moravče, Slovenia
 Næstved, Denmark
 Nagycenk, Hungary
 Nadur, Malta
 Ockelbo, Sweden
 Pano Lefkara, Cyprus
 Põlva, Estonia
 Samuel (Soure), Portugal
 Slivo Pole, Bulgaria
 Starý Poddvorov, Czech Republic
 Strzyżów, Poland
 Tisno, Croatia
 Troisvierges, Luxembourg
 Žagarė (Joniškis), Lithuania

V
Valka

 Braslaw, Belarus
 Çamlıyayla, Turkey
 Durbuy, Belgium
 I'billin, Israel
 Kościelisko, Poland
 Kobylnica, Poland
 Kutaisi, Georgia
 Marijampolė, Lithuania
 Novoye Devyatkino, Russia
 Orimattila, Finland
 Östhammar, Sweden
 Tvrdošín, Slovakia
 Valga, Estonia
 Valga, Spain

Valmiera

 Cherkasy, Ukraine
 Halle, Germany
 Høje-Taastrup, Denmark
 Solna, Sweden
 Vallefoglia, Italy
 Viljandi, Estonia
 Zduńska Wola, Poland

Valmiera – Naukšēni

 Borgholzhausen, Germany
 Helme (Tõrva), Estonia

Vecpiebalga

 Aremark, Norway
 Bürgel, Germany
 Marker, Norway

Ventspils

 Lorient, France
 Ningbo, China
 Novopolotsk, Belarus
 Polotsk, Belarus
 Stralsund, Germany
 Västervik, Sweden

References

Latvia
Latvia geography-related lists
Towns in Latvia
Populated places in Latvia